Marie Louise Marguerite Belèze (1851-1913), also credited as Marguerite Belèze, was a French botanist, taxonomist, and explorer.  She collected extensive botanical collections, and is known for her work on the cryptogamic flora surrounding Paris. Some of her plant collections are held at the University of Strasbourg's Herbarium

Written works
 Marie Louise Marguerite Belèze. 1898. Liste des plantes rares ou intéressantes, phanérogames, cryptogames vasculaires et characées, des environs de Montfort-l'Amaury et de la forêt de Rambouillet, Seine-et-Oise. Bull. of the Société botanique de France, 42.

References

1851 births
1913 deaths
French women scientists
20th-century French botanists
French taxonomists
Women taxonomists
19th-century French botanists